Bulgaria selected their Junior Eurovision Song Contest 2008 entry by a national final, which was held on 18 September 2008. The winner was Krestiana Kresteva with the song "Edna Mechta" which represented Bulgaria in Junior Eurovision Song Contest 2008 on 22 November 2008.

Before Junior Eurovision

National final 
Artists and songwriters were able to submit their entries until 31 March 2008. From all songs submitted to BNT, an expert committee selected ten songs for the competition. After the list was released, Ani Svetlozarova and Natalia Danielova withdrew from the competition. As a result of this, Usmivka and Krestiana Kresteva participated in the national final instead.

Final 
The final took place on 18 September 2008, hosted by Uti Bachvarov and Victoria Terziyska. Ten songs competed and the winner was determined by public televoting. Voting was open for 10 minutes, and at the conclusion of the voting, "Edna mechta" performed by Krestiana Kresteva was the winner, receiving almost 45% of the public vote.

Controversy
Prior to the pre-selection local Bulgarian newspaper, Trud, accused organizers of fixing the selection process in favour of the eventual winner, Krestiana Kresteva. A member of the pre-selection committee, Svetoslav Loboshki, denied the accusation, stating,  "The article is based on false assumptions of the journalist or is an improper publicity stunt by some of the parents, whose children are involved in preselection".

At Junior Eurovision
At Junior Eurovision, Bulgaria performed in the eighth slot.

Voting

Notes

References

External links 
 Junior Eurovision 2008 page at BNT Website

Junior Eurovision Song Contest
Bulgaria
2008